Olaballari also known as Valaballari is a village in the Sindhanur taluk of Raichur district in Karnataka state, India. This village is located on the banks of Tungabhadra river.  Olaballari is one of the holy place. Olaballari is 30 km from sindhanur.

Demographics 
As of 2001 India census, Olaballari had a population of 1,298 with 914 males and 903 females and 235 Households.

See also 
 Salagunda
 Roudkunda
 Amba Matha
 Maski
 Sindhanur
 Raichur

References 

Villages in Raichur district